Angus Buchanan,  (11 August 1894 – 1 March 1944) was an English recipient of the Victoria Cross, the highest and most prestigious award for gallantry in the face of the enemy that can be awarded to British and Commonwealth forces.

Early life
Buchanan was the son of a doctor from Coleford, Gloucestershire. He was educated at Monmouth School, where he was head boy.  In 1913 he went to Jesus College, Oxford to study classics. One of his tutors described him as "thoroughly Scotch and rather reserved, but a hard worker & likely to be a good influence in the Coll[ege]". He rowed for the college in 1914, played rugby and was Secretary of the Athletics Club.  He then joined the army, where he served at Gallipoli and in Mesopotamia.  He was awarded the Military Cross in 1916, and was mentioned four times in despatches.

Award of the Victoria Cross
Buchanan was 21 years old, and a temporary captain in the 4th Battalion, South Wales Borderers, British Army during the First World War when the action for which he received his Victoria Cross took place, in the attempts to relive the British forces besieged at Kut.  On 5 April 1916 at the Falauyah Lines he rescued two wounded men while under heavy enemy fire. The award was announced in a supplement to the London Gazette of 26 September 1916:

On 8 November 1917 he was invested with the Victoria Cross and the Military Cross at a ceremony on Durdham Downs, Bristol, by King George V. The ceremony was recorded by Pathé News (see External links). Buchanan had previously been awarded the Russian decoration of the Order of St. Vladimir 4th Class (with Swords) in July 1916.

Later life
On 13 February 1917 Buchanan was shot in the head by a sniper and permanently blinded. He attributed his survival to the care of his batman, Private Mark Perry. He rejoined Jesus College after the war and read law, rowing for the college in 1919 despite his blindness.  After graduating in 1921, he worked in a solicitor's office in Oxford before returning to Coleford to work until his death in 1944.  In 1921 he attended Monmouth School for the ceremony marking the dedication of the school's war memorial, which he unveiled. Funds were raised in Coleford to mark his bravery and, at Buchanan's request, were used to purchase a playing field for the use of the local children.  Buchanan died on 1 March 1944 and was buried in Coleford Cemetery, next to the recreation field named in his honour.

In addition to the playing field at Coleford, Buchanan is also remembered at Monmouth School, where the Upper Sixth Form boarding house, Buchanan House, commemorates him. His Victoria Cross was displayed at the Regimental Museum of The Royal Welsh in Brecon but, following its purchase by Michael Ashcroft in 2013, is now in the Lord Ashcroft VC Collection at The Imperial War Museum.

See also
Monuments to Courage (David Harvey, 1999)
The Register of the Victoria Cross (This England, 1997)

References

External links
Pathe News coverage of Buchanan's investiture ceremony

1894 births
1944 deaths
People from Coleford, Gloucestershire
British Army personnel of World War I
South Wales Borderers officers
Recipients of the Military Cross
British World War I recipients of the Victoria Cross
Alumni of Jesus College, Oxford
English solicitors
English blind people
Recipients of the Order of St. Vladimir, 4th class
People educated at Monmouth School for Boys
British Army recipients of the Victoria Cross
Blind lawyers
Burials in Gloucestershire
Military personnel from Gloucestershire